Pithapuram Mandal is one of the 21 mandals in Kakinada district of Andhra Pradesh. As per census 2011, there are 1 town and 22 villages.

Demographics 
Pithapuram Mandal has total population of 129,282 as per the Census 2011 out of which 64,906 are males while 64,376 are females and the average Sex Ratio of Pithapuram Mandal is 992. The total literacy rate of Pithapuram Mandal is 68.03%. The male literacy rate is 63.29% and the female literacy rate is 58.84%.

Towns & Villages

Towns 

 Pithapuram (Municipality)

Villages 
Agraharam
B. Kothuru
Bhogapuram
Chitrada
Fakruddinpalem
Gokivada
Govindarajupalem
Jagapathirajapuram
Jalluru
Jamulapalle
Kandarada
Kolanka
Madhavapuram
Mallam
Mangiturthi
Navakandravada
Pro. Donthamuru
Pro. Rayavaram
Raparthi
Veldurthi
Virava
Viravada

See also 
List of mandals in Andhra Pradesh

References 

Mandals in Kakinada district
Mandals in Andhra Pradesh